The Segugio Maremmano is an Italian breed of scent hound from the coastal plains of the Maremma, in Tuscany. It is mainly used for hunting wild boar, but may also be used to hunt hare and other mammals. They may be either smooth-haired or rough-haired.

History 

The breed was recognized by the Ente Nazionale della Cinofilia Italiana in 2009. More than 6600 dogs were registered in that year, the highest number of registrations for any Italian breed. In 2018 there were 5679 new registrations, of which over 90% were of smooth-haired dogs.

It was provisionally accepted by the Fédération Cynologique Internationale in 2018.

In 2015 an analysis of microsatellite data found no significant genetic distance between the Segugio dell'Appennino and the Segugio Maremmano.

Characteristics 

The coat may be either smooth or rough; in colour it may be fawn, varying from pale fawn to a dark tan; black and tan; or brindle.

See also
 Dogs portal
 List of dog breeds

References 

FCI breeds
Scent hounds
Dog breeds originating in Italy
Rare dog breeds